Andre Titus O'Neal (born December 12, 1975) is a former linebacker in the National Football League who played for the Kansas City Chiefs, the Green Bay Packers, and the Minnesota Vikings.  O'Neal played collegiate ball for Marshall University and played professionally in the NFL for 2 seasons.

References

1975 births
Living people
People from Decatur, Georgia
Players of American football from Georgia (U.S. state)
Sportspeople from DeKalb County, Georgia
American football linebackers
Marshall Thundering Herd football players
Kansas City Chiefs players
Green Bay Packers players
Minnesota Vikings players